Craig Starcevich (born 16 May 1967) is a former Australian rules footballer who played in the VFL/AFL.  He is the only person in Australian rules football history to win both an AFL and an AFL Women’s premiership, having won the latter as coach. He currently works as the Brisbane Lions women's team coach and AFL Queensland Female Football High Performance Manager.

He was recruited from East Perth, whom he played 37 games for after he won the 1986 F. D. Book Medal for being judged their best and fairest player. On the back of this, he was recruited to Collingwood in the VFL.

Starcevich made his VFL debut in 1987 with the Collingwood Football Club. He played the role of a key-position player, coming off the bench in Collingwood's 1990 premiership side to be a solid contributor during the AFL Grand Final. He played 124 games and kicked 162 goals for Collingwood before moving to the Brisbane Bears at the end of 1993 as part of the trade that saw Nathan Buckley go to Collingwood. He played 20 games and kicked 16 goals for the Bears before retiring at the end of 1995.

Following his retirement from AFL football as a player, Starcevich became one of the most prominent fitness trainers in the AFL. Since arriving at the Bears at the end of 1993, he has been involved in every one of the Brisbane Football Club’s four premierships (3 AFL and 1 AFLW) and seven (4 AFL & 3 AFLW) grand final appearances. In 2006, he was recruited as part of the St Kilda Football Club's head of training services in an attempt to turn around the club's large injury list in the 2005 season. During the 2006 pre-season, Starcevich adopted a controversial policy whereby players were banned from wearing thongs, citing the fact that they could increase the risk of injuries to feet. He left the Saints before the 2007 season citing "family reasons".

In March 2007, Starcevich joined A-league team Queensland Roar as strength and conditioning coach.

In June 2016, Starcevich was appointed head coach of the Brisbane Lions women's team. Starcevich guided the Lions to the minor premiership in the inaugural season of AFL Women's in 2017. By finishing first, the Lions qualified for the 2017 AFL Women's Grand Final. The team lost to the Adelaide Crows in the decider. In the league's second season, the Lions once again lost the Grand Final by six points under Starcevich, in a game which ended 27–21 in favour of the Western Bulldogs.

His son Jackson Starcevich played for Collingwood in the VFL, and nephew Brandon Starcevich currently plays for Brisbane in the AFL.

Coaching statistics
Statistics are correct to the end of the 2021 season

|- style="background-color: #EAEAEA"
! scope="row" style="font-weight:normal"|2017
|
| 8 || 6 || 1 || 1 || 75% || 1 || 8
|-
! scope="row" style="font-weight:normal"|2018
|
| 8 || 4 || 4 || 0 || 50% || 2 || 8
|-
! scope="row" style="font-weight:normal"|2019
|
| 7 || 2 || 5 || 0 || 28.57% || 9 || 10
|-
! scope="row" style="font-weight:normal"|2020
|
| 6 || 3 || 3 || 0 || 50% || 7 || 14
|-
! scope="row" style="font-weight:normal"|2021
|
| 11 || 9 || 2 || 0 || 81.81% || 2 || 14
|- class="sortbottom"
! colspan=2| Career totals
! 39
! 24
! 15
! 1
! 61.54%
! colspan=2|
|}

References

Brisbane Bears players
1967 births
Living people
Collingwood Football Club players
Collingwood Football Club Premiership players
East Perth Football Club players
Australian physiotherapists
Australian rules footballers from Western Australia
Western Australian State of Origin players
AFL Women's coaches
One-time VFL/AFL Premiership players